The 1995–96 Munster Rugby season was Munster's first season as a professional team, during which they competed in the IRFU Interprovincial Championship and Heineken Cup.

1995–96 squad

1995–96 Heineken Cup

Pool 4

1995–96 IRFU Interprovincial Championship

References

External links
1995–96 Munster Rugby season official site 
1995–96 Munster Rugby Heineken Cup

1995-96
1995–96 in Irish rugby union